Richard Levy may refer to:
 Richard N. Levy (1937–2019), American Reform rabbi
 Richard S. Levy, American professor of history
 Richard Levy (paleoclimatologist), New Zealand glacial stratigrapher and paleoclimatologist
 Dick Levy (Richard Meyer Levy), chief executive officer of Varian Medical Systems

See also
Richard Levy Gallery, an art gallery in Albuquerque, New Mexico